William Elliott may refer to:

In the arts
William Elliott (lieutenant) (died 1792), lieutenant in the Royal Navy and marine painter
William Elliott (engraver) (1727–1766), English engraver
Wild Bill Elliott (1904–1965), American film actor sometimes credited as Bill Elliott; birth name Gordon Nance
William Elliott (actor, born 1934) (1934–1983), American stage and film actor
William Elliott (actor, born 1879) (1879–1932), American stage and film actor
Will Elliott (born 1979), Australian horror fiction writer
William A. Elliott, art director

In military
William Elliott (lieutenant) (died 1792), lieutenant in the Royal Navy and marine painter
William Henry Elliott (1792–1874), British general
Sir William Elliot (RAF officer) (1896–1971), senior RAF commander during WWII
William Elliott (RAF officer) (1898–1979), World War I flying ace

In politics and government
William Yandell Elliott (1896–1979), American historian and political advisor
William Elliott, Baron Elliott of Morpeth (1920–2011), British Conservative party politician, MP 1957–1983
William J. S. Elliott, Commissioner of the Royal Canadian Mounted Police
William Elliott (American politician) (1838–1907), U.S. congressman from South Carolina
William Elliott (Peel MP) (1834–1912), member of the Canadian House of Commons representing Peel, 1878–1882
William Elliott (Pennsylvania politician), Speaker of the Pennsylvania House of Representatives, 1872–1873
William Elliott (Saskatchewan politician) (1863–1934), member of the Northwest Territories legislature 1898–1905 and Saskatchewan assembly 1905–1912
William Elliott (Upper Canada politician) (1775–? or later), politician in Upper Canada
William Elliott (Ontario politician) (1872–1944), Progressive Party member of the Canadian House of Commons
William Herbert Elliott (1872–?), businessman and political figure in Ontario
William M. Elliott (died 1882), American politician

In sports
William Elliott (writer) (1788–1863), South Carolinian sportsman and writer
William Elliott (rower) (1849–?), English professional sculling champion
William Elliott (cricketer) (1842–?), English cricketer

See also
William Elliot (disambiguation)
Billy Elliot (disambiguation)
William Eliot (disambiguation)